The Tahaenui River is a river of the Hawke's Bay region of New Zealand's North Island. It flows generally southeast to reach Hawke Bay five kilometres west of Nūhaka.

See also
List of rivers of New Zealand

References

Rivers of the Hawke's Bay Region
Rivers of New Zealand